This article presents a list of the historical events and publications of Australian literature during 1976.

Events

Major publications

Books 
 Robert Drewe – The Savage Crows
 David Ireland – The Glass Canoe
 Thomas Keneally – Season in Purgatory
 Frank Moorhouse – Conference-Ville
 Gerald Murnane – A Lifetime on Clouds
 Christina Stead – Miss Herbert (The Suburban Wife)
 Morris West – The Navigator
 Patrick White – A Fringe of Leaves

Short stories 
 Elizabeth Jolley – Five Acre Virgin and Other Stories
 Dal Stivens – The Unicorn and Other Tales

Science Fiction and Fantasy 
 A. Bertram Chandler – The Way Back
 Lee Harding
The Altered I : An Encounter with Science Fiction (edited)
 Future Sanctuary
 David Lake – Walkers on the Sky

Children's and Young Adult fiction 
 Hesba Brinsmead – Under the Silkwood
 Elyne Mitchell – Son of the Whirlwind
 Eleanor Spence – The October Child

Poetry 

 John Blight – Selected Poems, 1939-1975
 Geoffrey Lehmann – Selected Poems
 Les Murray
 "The Buladelah-Taree Holiday Song Cycle"
 Selected Poems: The Vernacular Republic
 Judith Wright – Fourth Quarter

Drama 
 Dorothy Hewett - The Tatty Hollow Story
 Steve J. Spears - The Elocution of Benjamin Franklin
 David Williamson
 The Club
 A Handful of Friends

Non-fiction 
 Donald Horne – Death of the Lucky Country
 Gavin Souter – Lion and Kangaroo

Awards and honours

Lifetime achievement

Literary

Children and Young Adult

Poetry

Births 
A list, ordered by date of birth (and, if the date is either unspecified or repeated, ordered alphabetically by surname) of births in 1976 of Australian literary figures, authors of written works or literature-related individuals follows, including year of death.

 26 May — Marieke Hardy, writer

Unknown date
 Kate Morton, novelist

Deaths 
A list, ordered by date of death (and, if the date is either unspecified or repeated, ordered alphabetically by surname) of deaths in 1976 of Australian literary figures, authors of written works or literature-related individuals follows, including year of birth.

 16 April  – Nina Murdoch, poet and biographer (born 1890)
 22 August – Ella McFadyen, poet (born 1887)
 15 October – James McAuley, poet (born 1917)
 23 October – Ian Mudie, poet (born 1911)
Unknown date

 Lyndall Hadow – short story writer and journalist (born 1903)

See also 
 1976 in Australia
 1976 in literature
 1976 in poetry
 List of years in Australian literature
List of years in literature

References

 
Australian literature by year
20th-century Australian literature
1976 in literature